jw2 or variation, may refer to:

 Tawas MRT station (station code: JW2) Singapore mass rapid transit station
 ACA JW-2, the ACA Industries aircraft model JW-2, see List of aircraft (0–Ah)
 Honda Today model JW2, a Japanese kei car
 Jurassic World: Fallen Kingdom (2018 film), sequel to Jurassic World (2015)

See also
 J2W, see List of postal codes of Canada: J
 JW (disambiguation)